The 2014 Humboldt State Lumberjacks football team represented Humboldt State University during the 2014 NCAA Division II football season. Humboldt State competed in the Great Northwest Athletic Conference (GNAC).

The 2014 Lumberjacks were led by seventh-year head coach Rob Smith. They played home games at the Redwood Bowl in Arcata, California. Humboldt State finished the season with a record of eight wins and two losses (8–2, 4–2 GNAC). The Lumberjacks outscored their opponents 388–181 for the 2014 season. This was a remarkable turnaround from the previous season when they were winless. Their offensive output increased from 15 points per game to 38, and the defense held the opponents to an average of 18 points versus 32 the previous year.

Schedule

References

Humboldt State
Humboldt State Lumberjacks football seasons
Humboldt State Lumberjacks football